Nacer Keddam (born 31 October 1976) is an Algerian boxer. He competed in the men's flyweight event at the 2000 Summer Olympics.

References

External links
 

1976 births
Living people
Algerian male boxers
Olympic boxers of Algeria
Boxers at the 2000 Summer Olympics
Place of birth missing (living people)
African Games medalists in boxing
Flyweight boxers
21st-century Algerian people
African Games silver medalists for Algeria
Competitors at the 1999 All-Africa Games